Aethalopteryx obsolete is a moth in the family Cossidae. It is found in Sudan, Tanzania and Eswatini.

References

Moths described in 1930
Aethalopteryx